In algebraic geometry, a prestack F over a category C equipped with some Grothendieck topology is a category together with a functor p: F → C satisfying a certain lifting condition and such that (when the fibers are groupoids) locally isomorphic objects are isomorphic. A stack is a prestack with effective descents, meaning local objects may be patched together to become a global object.

Prestacks that appear in nature are typically stacks but some naively constructed prestacks (e.g., groupoid scheme or the prestack of projectivized vector bundles) may not be stacks. Prestacks may be studied on their own or passed to stacks.

Since a stack is a prestack, all the results on prestacks are valid for stacks as well. Throughout the article, we work with a fixed base category C; for example, C can be the category of all schemes over some fixed scheme equipped with some Grothendieck topology.

Informal definition 
Let F be a category and suppose it is fibered over C through the functor ; this means that one can construct pullbacks along morphisms in C, up to canonical isomorphisms.

For each  over U, define the restriction map from f to g: 
to be the composition

where a canonical isomorphism  is used to get the = on the right. Then  is a presheaf on the slice category , the category of all morphisms in C with target U.

This definition can be equivalently phrased as follows. First, for each covering family , we "define" the category  as a category where: writing , etc.,
An object of this category is called a descent datum. This category is not well-defined; the issue is that the pullbacks are determined only up to canonical isomorphisms; similarly fiber products are defined only up to canonical isomorphisms, despite the notational practice to the contrary. In practice, one simply makes some canonical identifications of pullbacks, their compositions, fiber products, etc.; up to such identifications, the above category is well-defined (in other words, it is defined up to a canonical equivalence of categories.)

There is an obvious functor  that sends an object to the descent datum that it defines. One can then say: F is a prestack if and only if, for each covering family , the functor  is fully faithful. A statement like this is independent of choices of canonical identifications mentioned early.

The essential image of  consists precisely of effective descent data (just the definition of "effective"). Thus, F is a stack if and only if, for each covering family ,  is an equivalence of categories.

These reformulations of the definitions of prestacks and stacks make intuitive meanings of those concepts very explicit: (1) "fibered category" means one can construct a pullback (2) "prestack in groupoids" additionally means "locally isomorphic" implies "isomorphic" (3) "stack in groupoids" means, in addition to the previous properties, a global object can be constructed from local data subject to cocycle conditions. All these work up to canonical isomorphisms.

Morphisms

Definitions 
Given prestacks  over the fixed base category C, a morphism  is a functor such that (1)  and (2) it maps cartesian morphisms to cartesian morphisms. Note (2) is automatic if G is fibered in groupoids; e.g., an algebraic stack (since all morphisms are cartesian then.)

If  is the stack associated to a scheme S in the base category C, then the fiber  is, by construction, the set of all morphisms from U to S in C. Analogously, given a scheme U in C viewed as a stack (i.e.) and a category F fibered in groupoids over C, the 2-Yoneda lemma says: there is a natural equivalence of categories

where  refers to the relative functor category; the objects are the functors from U to F over C and the morphisms are the base-preserving natural transformations.

Fiber product 
Let  be morphisms of prestacks. Then, by definition, the fiber product  is the category where
 an object is a triple  consisting of an object x in F, an object y in G, both over the same object in C, and an isomorphism  in G over the identity morphism in C, and

This fiber product behaves like a usual fiber product but up to natural isomorphisms. The meaning of this is the following. Firstly, the obvious square does not commute; instead, for each object  in :
.
That is, there is an invertible natural transformation (= natural isomorphism)
.

When B is the base category C (the prestack over itself), B is dropped and one simply writes . Note, in this case,   in objects are all identities.

Example: Given , .

Example: Given  and the diagonal morphism ,
;
this isomorphism is constructed simply by hand.

Representable morphisms 
A morphism of prestacks  is said to be strongly representable if, for every morphism  from a scheme S in C viewed as a prestack, the fiber product  of prestacks is a scheme in C.

In particular, the definition applies to the structure map  (the base category C is a prestack over itself via the identity). Then p is strongly representable if and only if  is a scheme in C.

The definition applies also to the diagonal morphism . If  is strongly representable, then every morphism  from a scheme U is strongly representable since  is strongly representable for any T → X.

If  is a strongly representable morphism, for any , S a scheme viewed as a prestack, the projection  is a morphism of schemes; this allows one to transfer many notions of properties on morphisms of schemes to the stack context. Namely, let P be a property on morphisms in the base category C that is stable under base changes and that is local on the topology of C (e.g., étale topology or smooth topology). Then a strongly representable morphism  of prestacks is said to have the property P if, for every morphism , T a scheme viewed as a prestack, the induced projection  has the property P.

Example: the prestack given by an action of an algebraic group 
Let G be an algebraic group acting from the right on a scheme X of finite type over a field k. Then the group action of G on X determines a prestack (but not a stack) over the category C of k-schemes, as follows. Let F be the category where
 an object is a pair  consisting of a scheme U in C and x in the set ,

Through the forgetful functor to C, this category F is fibered in groupoids and is known as an action groupoid or a transformation groupoid. The construction is a special case of forming #The prestack of equivalence classes; in particular, F is a prestack.

When X is a point  and G is affine, the quotient  is the classifying prestack of G and its stackification is the classifying stack of G.

One viewing X as a prestack (in fact a stack), there is the obvious canonical map

over C; explicitly, each object  in the prestack X goes to itself, and each morphism , satisfying x equals  by definition, goes to the identity group element of G(U).

Then the above canonical map fits into a 2-coequalizer (a 2-quotient):
,
where t: (x, g) → xg is the given group action and s a projection. It is not 1-coequalizer since, instead of the equality , one has  given by

The prestack of equivalence classes 
Let X be a scheme in the base category C. By definition, an equivalence pre-relation is a morphism  in C such that, for each scheme T in C, the function  has the image that is an equivalence relation. The prefix "pre-" is because we do not require  to be an injective function.

Example: Let an algebraic group G act on a scheme X of finite type over a field k. Take  and then for any scheme T over k let

By Yoneda's lemma, this determines a morphism f, which is clearly an equivalence pre-relation.

To each given equivalence pre-relation  (+ some more data), there is an associated prestack F defined as follows. Firstly, F is a category where: with the notations ,

Via a forgetful functor, the category F is fibered in groupoids.

Since the fiber product of sheaves is a sheaf, it follows that  is a sheaf.

Note, when X is viewed as a stack, both X and  have the same set of objects. On the morphism-level, while X has only identity morphisms as morphisms, the prestack  have additional morphisms  specified by the equivalence pre-relation f.

One importance of this construction is that it provides an atlas for an algebraic space: every algebraic space is of the form  for some schemes U, R and an étale equivalence pre-relation  such that, for each T,  is an injective function ("étale" means the two possible maps  are étale.)

Starting from a Deligne–Mumford stack , one can find an equivalence pre-relation  for some schemes R, U so that  is the stackification of the prestack associated to it: . This is done as follows. By definition, there is an étale surjective morphism  from some scheme U. Since the diagonal is strongly representable, the fiber product  is a scheme (that is, represented by a scheme) and then let

be the first and second projections. Taking , we see  is an equivalence pre-relation. We finish, roughly, as follows.
 By the universal property of stackification,  factors through .
 Check the last map is an isomorphism.

Stacks associated to prestacks 
There is a way to associate a stack to a given prestack. It is similar to the sheafification of a presheaf and is called stackification. The idea of the construction is quite simple: given a prestack , we let HF be the category where an object is a descent datum and a morphism is that of descent data. (The details are omitted for now)

As it turns out, it is a stack and comes with a natural morphism  such that F is a stack if and only if θ is an isomorphism.

In some special cases, the stackification can be described in terms of torsors for affine group schemes or the generalizations. In fact, according to this point of view, a stack in groupoids is nothing but a category of torsors, and a prestack a category of trivial torsors, which are local models of torsors.

Notes

References

External links 

Algebraic geometry